Idnea is a genus of snout moths. It was described by Gottlieb August Wilhelm Herrich-Schäffer in 1858.

Species
 Idnea altana (Walker, 1863)
 Idnea concolorana (Walker, 1863)
 Idnea felicella Dyar, 1913
 Idnea propriana (Walker, 1863)
 Idnea speculans Herrich-Schäffer, [1858]

References

Chrysauginae
Pyralidae genera